Zhang Zhen Xuan (born 2 February 1984) is a Chinese actor, formerly based in Singapore and was named as one of the 8 Dukes of Caldecott Hill. He was prominently a full-time Mediacorp artiste from 2008 to 2018. He changed his name to Zhang Zhenxuan, saying that his past name was complicated.

Early life
Zhang was born in Sichuan, China and moved to Singapore as a teenager. He graduated from the National University of Singapore with a degree in civil engineering.

Career
In 2008, Zhang was spotted after his runner-up finish in the MediaCorp Channel U talent show U Are The One and was signed by MediaCorp. Prior to that, he had a small cameo appearance on the last episode of Rhapsody in Blue in 2006. He was nominated for the Best Newcomer Award at the Star Awards 2009. His breakthrough came in the 2009 anniversary drama Together and he won nominations for the best supporting actor at the Star Awards and Asian Television Awards in 2010. His career peaked when he picked up his first trophy, the Top 10 Most Popular Male Artistes at the Star Awards 20 and was also crowned as one of the 8 Dukes of Caldecott Hill. The following year, in 2015, he bagged both the Favourite Male Character and Favourite Onscreen Couple awards for his work in World at Your Feet at the Star Awards 2015.

Filmography

Television

Film

Compilation album

Personal life 
He can speak Chinese, Sichuanese, and English.

Relationship 
On 26 November 2020, Zhang announced on Instagram that his longtime girlfriend, Pan Sichen, is pregnant with his baby. On 27 November 2020, Pan Sichen announced on Instagram to clarify that they are married. Zhang announced a year later on Instagram that he has a second child.

Awards and nominations

References

External links

 Zhang Zhenhuan profile on The Celebrity Agency

Living people
Male actors from Sichuan
National University of Singapore alumni
1984 births
Chinese male film actors
Chinese male television actors
21st-century Chinese male actors